This was the first edition of the tournament. 

Unseeded Veronika Kudermetova won the title, defeating Marie Bouzková 6–2, 6–0 in the final.

Seeds

Draw

Finals

Top half

Bottom half

Qualifying

Seeds

Qualifiers

Lucky losers

Draw

First qualifier

Second qualifier

Third qualifier

Fourth qualifier

References

Main Draw
Qualifying Draw

2019 Abierto Zapopan – 1
Abierto Zapopan – 1
Mex